Shang Guangxu (born 8 May 1995) is a Paralympian athlete from China competing mainly in T37 classification track and field events. Liang represented his country at the 2012 Summer Paralympics in London where he won a silver medal in the men's 200m sprint. He has also competed at the IPC World Championships in 2015 winning a silver in the 200m and a gold in the long jump.

Notes

1995 births
Chinese male sprinters
Chinese male long jumpers
Paralympic athletes of China
Athletes (track and field) at the 2012 Summer Paralympics
Paralympic gold medalists for China
Living people
Medalists at the 2012 Summer Paralympics
Runners from Tianjin
Medalists at the 2016 Summer Paralympics
Paralympic medalists in athletics (track and field)
21st-century Chinese people